Jacqueline "Jaci" Seifriedsberger (born 20 January 1991) is an Austrian ski jumper.

She represents SC Waldzell club. She was selected to compete for Austria in the 2009 World Championship and 2011 World Championship in Oslo. She also won a gold medal on normal hill at 2008 FIS Junior World Championships in Zakopane. She won one World Cup event in Sapporo and four additional podiums in her career.

Career
Jacqueline Seifriedsberger started ski jumping in 1995. On 23 July 2004, she debuted at the Ski Jumping Continental Cup in Park City.

She reached her first podium in Yamagata on 1 March 2006.

On 3 February 2013, Jacqueline Seifriedsberger won her first World Cup competition in Sapporo after finishing second the day before.

At the Nordic World Ski Championships 2013 in Val di Fiemme she won the bronze medal in the individual competition. With her teammates Chiara Hölzl, Gregor Schlierenzauer and Thomas Morgenstern, she won the silver medal in the mixed competition.

Jacqueline Seifriedsberger missed the Winter Olympic Games 2014 in Sochi due to a knee injury obtained during training in Hinterzarten.

At the Nordic World Ski Championships 2017 in Lahti, she won her second silver medal in the mixed competition after 2013; this time together with her teammates Daniela Iraschko-Stolz, Michael Hayböck and Stefan Kraft.

In 2018, she competed for the first time at the Winter Olympic Games in Pyeongchang. She finished thirteenth in the individual competition.

World Cup

Standings

Wins

References

External links

1991 births
Living people
Austrian female ski jumpers
FIS Nordic World Ski Championships medalists in ski jumping
Ski jumpers at the 2018 Winter Olympics
Olympic ski jumpers of Austria
People from Ried im Innkreis District
Sportspeople from Upper Austria
21st-century Austrian women